Werner Swanepoel (born 15 April 1973) is a former South African rugby union player. He played as a scrum half for the Springboks from 1997 to 2000.  His appearances for the Springboks were curtailed by virtue of his career coinciding with that of Joost van der Westhuizen. For the toothy grin he often flashed on the rugby field, he was given the nickname, "Smiley".

Career
Swanepoel attended Grey College in Bloemfontein and played for the  Craven Week team from 1989 to 1991 and was selected for the South African Schools team in 1991.

Swanepoel made his debut for the Springboks in 1997 against the British Lions at Ellis Park in Johannesburg. He represented South Africa in the 1999 Rugby World Cup, scoring a try in their pool match against Spain. In 2001, he was a replacement for The Barbarians in their match against Australia in Cardiff.  His career was ended unexpectedly when he contracted viral meningitis while he was playing with the English club, Worcester.

Test history

See also
List of South Africa national rugby union players – Springbok no. 654

References

External links
 espnscrum.com
 Barabarianfc.co.uk

1973 births
Living people
Afrikaner people
Alumni of Grey College, Bloemfontein
Bulls (rugby union) players
Expatriate rugby union players in England
Free State Cheetahs players
Lions (United Rugby Championship) players
Rugby union players from Bloemfontein
Rugby union scrum-halves
South Africa international rugby union players
South African expatriate rugby union players
South African expatriate sportspeople in England
South African people of Dutch descent
South African rugby union players
University of Pretoria alumni
Worcester Warriors players